Maarten Van Garderen (born 24 January 1990) is a Dutch professional volleyball player. He is part of the Dutch national team. At the professional club level, he plays for Emma Villas Volley.

Honours

Clubs
 FIVB Club World Championship
  Poland 2018 – with Trentino Volley
 CEV Cup
  2018/2019 – with Itas Trentino
 CEV Challenge Cup
  2020/2021 – with Ziraat Bankası Ankara
 National championships
 2011/2012  Dutch Championship, with Orion Doetinchem
 2014/2015  German Cup, with VfB Friedrichshafen
 2014/2015  German Championship, with VfB Friedrichshafen
 2020/2021  Turkish Championship, with Ziraat Bankası Ankara

References

External links

 
 Player profile at LegaVolley.it 
 Player profile at Volleybox.net

1990 births
Living people
People from Renswoude
Sportspeople from Utrecht (province)
Dutch men's volleyball players
Dutch expatriate sportspeople in Germany
Expatriate volleyball players in Germany
Dutch expatriate sportspeople in Italy
Expatriate volleyball players in Italy
Dutch expatriate sportspeople in Turkey
Expatriate volleyball players in Turkey
Outside hitters